The  is a DC electric multiple unit (EMU) commuter train type introduced in 1963 by Japanese National Railways (JNR), and currently operated by West Japan Railway Company (JR West) and Kyushu Railway Company (JR Kyushu). They were also operated by East Japan Railway Company (JR East) and Central Japan Railway Company (JR Central).

Some former JR East sets were also sold for second hand use in Indonesia, where they operated on the KRL Jabodetabek system in Jakarta between 2004 and 2016.

Operations

JR East

JR East has operated previously a large number of 103 series sets on the following lines.
 Chūō Line (Rapid) (1973~83; and then also used on the Diamond anniversary (75th anniversary) celebration of Mitaka Station in June 2005)
 Chūō-Sōbu Line (1979~2001; 1971~2003 for Tokyo Metro Tozai Line through-running services)
 Hachikō Line (1996–2005)
 Jōban Line (1971~86 for Chiyoda Line through-running services; 1967–2006 for Joban Line Rapid and Narita-Abiko Line through service)
 Kawagoe Line (1985–2005)
 Keihin-Tōhoku Line (1965–1998)
 Keiyō Line (1986–2005)
 Musashino Line (1980–2005)
 Nambu Line (1982–2004)
 Ōme Line (1976–2002)
 Akabane Line (now Saikyo Line) (1978–1990)
 Senseki Line (1979–2004; 2006~09)
 Tsurumi Line (1990–2005)
 Yamanote Line (1963~88)
 Yokohama Line (1972~89)

A single four-car 103 series set had remained in use by JR East on the Senseki Line in the Sendai area between November 2006 up until 21 October 2009.

JR Central
JR Central has formerly used 103 series sets on Chuo Main Line services in the Nagoya area, but these were subsequently replaced by 211 series and 313 series trains.

JR-West

JR-West continues to operate a large number of 103 series sets, many of which have received extensive life-extension refurbishment.
JR-West currently operates 103 series sets on the following lines. They were also used on the Osaka Loop Line until October 2017. As of 2019, there are 63 cars still available in service.
 Sakurai Line
 Bantan Line
 Kakogawa Line

Previous Operations (JR West):
 Akō Line
 Kabe Line (1992–March 2011)
 Kure Line (1992–March 15, 2015)
 Osaka Loop Line (1969–October 2017)
 Sakurajima Line (1969–October 2017)
 Yamatoji Line (1969–January 25, 2018)
 Wakayama Line (1970–January 2018)
 Osaka Higashi Line (1969–January 25, 2018)
 Hanwa Line (1968–March 16, 2018)
 Nara Line (1985-March 11, 2022)
 Sanyō Main Line (Wadamisaki Branch Line, last standing original 6-car trainset remain in service, sometimes substituted by 207 series, 2001–March 18, 2023)

JR Kyushu
JR Kyushu operates a fleet of 103–1500 series sets on JR Chikuhi Line inter-running services. As of 2018, there are six 3-car trainsets still remain in service.
 Chikuhi Line (1982–present)

Overseas operations
Four former JR East 103 series 4-car units (Musashino Line sets KeYo 20, 21, 22, and 27) were shipped to Indonesia in 2004 to operate on the KRL Jabodetabek system in Jakarta.
 KuMoHa 103: 105, 153
 MoHa 103: 654, 752
 MoHa 102: 231, 321, 810, 2009
 KuHa 103: 359, 384, 597, 632, 815, 822
 SaHa 103: 210, 246

These cars retain their Japanese numbering.

As of November 2016, all 103 series have been withdrawn.

←

103-0 series

The 103–0 series trains were built between 1963 and 1981. Built for JNR as an "upgraded" version of the 101 series, the 103 series has been widely used around Japan and has been manufactured in a multitude of different body styles and configurations.

Based on the earlier 101 series, the 103 series has been used on various commuter services since 1963. In fact, some 103 series cars were actually converted from 101 series cars. The 103 series was the main rolling stock used on urban commuter services for a time.

Some sets have been used for at least 50 years, and their age is starting to show; as such, their use on various lines is diminishing and they are being replaced by newer trains. For instance, the 103 series are being replaced by the newer 323 series on the Osaka Loop Line where they famously operate.

The sets have been manufactured in a multitude of different body styles, with additional body styles being created over the years. Older sets had body styles similar to the one used on the 101 series.

Prototype 
This 8-car unit was built in 1963 without air-conditioning. The cars were withdrawn from service between 1988 and 1991.
 Moha 103: 901-902
 Moha 102: 901-902
 Kuha 103: 901-904

Standard series 
These were built between 1964 and 1970. While not originally fitted with air-conditioning, most of the cars were fitted with air conditioning from 1975. The bogies of the trailer cars were changed from TR201 to TR212 for the cars built from 1968. Cars fitted with TR212 bogies feature disc brakes, because they needed to run on higher speeds on the Jōban and Hanwa Lines.
 KuMoHa 103: 1-155
 MoHa 103: 1-278
 MoHa 102: 1-433
 KuHa 103: 1-177 & 501-638 (TR212 bogies fitted: 115-177 & 617–638)
 SaHa 103: 1-305 (TR212 bogies fitted: 226–305)

Air-conditioned prototype 
This single 10-car unit was built in 1970. It was equipped with various air conditioning units and tested on the Yamanote Line in Tokyo. It was subsequently modified to become a standard air-conditioned set in 1978. In 2000, four cars were scrapped at the Narashino Depot; the remaining six cars were scrapped at Keiyō Rolling Stock Center in 2005.
 MoHa 103: 279-281
 MoHa 102: 434-436
 KuHa 103: 178-179
 SaHa 103: 306-307

Sets without air-conditioning 
Built during 1972 and 1973, these units were similar to the air-conditioned prototype but without air-conditioning. This type was used mainly in Osaka area. Most cars were fitted with air-conditioning from 1976.
 MoHa 103: 282-330 & 364-374
 MoHa 102: 437-486 & 520-530
 KuHa 103: 180-212
 SaHa 103: 308-323

Air-conditioned sets 
Built in 1973, they were similar to the air-conditioned prototype. They were fitted with motorized destination blinds on both sides.
 MoHa 103: 331-413 (excluding 364–374)
 MoHa 102: 487-569 (excluding 520–530)
 KuHa 103: 213-268
 SaHa 103: 324-359

ATC equipped sets 
Built between 1974 and 1980. The front end design was changed with the driver's cab raised so that an ATC signalling system could be included. Kuha 103 of this version was used in the Tokyo area only.
 MoHa 103: 414-713
 MoHa 102: 570-869
 KuHa 103: 269-796 (excluding 500–700), 798, 809, 816
 SaHa 103: 360-471

Raised driver's cab 
Built between 1979 and 1984. The front end design was the same as the ATC-equipped sets, although this type was not fitted with ATC. Kuha 103-811 & 816 were converted to include ATC in 1984.
 MoHa 103: 714-793
 MoHa 102: 870-2050 (excluding 900–2000)
 KuHa 103: 797, 799-850 (excluding 809, 816, 845, 847, 849)
 SaHa 103: 472-503

Converted from 101 series 
Some 101 series trailer cars were converted to the 103–0 series. The cars' bodies and bogies were 101 series originals as the conversions involved minimum modification. The last of these cars were withdrawn from service in 1999.
 SaHa 103: 751-780 (from SaHa 101)
 KuHa 103: 2001-2004 (from KuHa 100), 2051-2052 (from KuHa 101)

Experimental direct-drive mechanism (DDM-VVVF) 

An insulated gate bipolar transistor traction system and direct-drive motors both manufactured by Toshiba were experimentally tested on car MoHa 103-502 (car #4) on ten-car set KeYo304 based on the Keiyō Line from May 2002; the car was originally manufactured in December 1975 by Nippon Sharyo. The direct-drive motors and IGBT inverters appear to be of the same specification as used on the experimental E993 series set due to similar cadences.

The use of direct-drive motors in the car gave the set a unique sound, with both the roar of the old-fashioned resistor-controlled traction motors and the more modern, high-pitched cadence of the variable frequency drive in car MoHa 103–502; MoHa 103-502's use of direct-drive motors gave the car itself a unique sound, as once the set reached a certain speed, the traction motors made no discernible noise.

The set entered service with the direct-drive motored car on 15 May 2003, but was retired and scrapped in December 2003 after just 7 months of service with this experimental car. Car MoHa 103-502 remains the last 103 series car to have been fitted with a variable frequency drive. No JR train since (other than the E993 and E331 series sets) has used direct-drive motors in combination with IGBT inverters.

103-1000 series

160 103–1000 series cars (formed 16 10-car sets) were built in 1970 and 1971 for use on Jōban Line-Chiyoda Line inter-running services, which commenced in 1971. Originally painted in grey with a sea green stripe, they were subsequently displaced by new 203 series trains. Some sets were later converted to become 105 series sets, and the rest of the fleet was reallocated to Jōban Line services from Ueno. In 1989, one Joban Line set was reallocated to the Chūō-Sōbu Line-Tōzai Line inter-running services. This set was repainted in grey with light-blue stripe, which was the same livery as the 103–1200 series. The last set was retired in March 2004.

103-1200 series

Similar to the 103–1000 series, these were 7-car sets built by Nippon Sharyo and Tokyu Car Corporation for use on Chūō-Sōbu Line-Tōzai Line inter-running services alongside the aluminium-bodied 301 series. Five sets (35 cars) were built between 1970 and 1978. They were initially painted in grey with a yellow stripe, but this was changed to a light blue stripe from 1989 to avoid confusion with the similarly coloured 205 series trains introduced on Chūō-Sōbu Line services. The last set was retired in July 2003.

103-1500 series

Nine 103–1500 series 6-car sets were built between 1982 and 1983 by Kawasaki Heavy Industries and Hitachi for use on inter-running services between the Chikuhi Line and the Fukuoka City Subway Kūkō Line in Kyushu. In 1989, four sets were reformed as eight 3-car sets (numbered E11 to E18) by rebuilding MoHa 103 and MoHa 102 cars as KuMoHa 103 and KuMoHa 102 cars respectively. They were initially painted in light blue with a white stripe, but were repainted into a grey and red livery from 1995. The 3-car sets were modified for driver-only operation between December 1999 and March 2001. Toilets were added to one end car of each set between June 2003 and October 2004.

103-3000 series

Five three-car 103–3000 series sets (numbered 51 to 55) were formed in 1985 from former 72–970 series EMU cars for use on the Kawagoe Line following electrification in September 1985. Five MoHa 72970 cars were also converted to SaHa 103-3000 cars to augment Ome Line trains. These cars were fitted with passenger-operated door controls. The five Kawagoe Line sets were lengthened to four cars between October 1995 and March 1996 ahead of Hachiko Line electrification in March 1996. The last set was withdrawn in October 2005.

Formation
 KuMoHa 102-3000
 MoHa 103-3000 (with pantograph)
 SaHa 103-3000
 KuHa 103-3000

103-3500 series (JR East)

One 4-car 103–3500 series set was formed in December 1995 from surplus 103–0 series cars to augment the fleet ahead of Hachikō Line electrification in March 1996. As with the 103–3000 series sets, passenger-operated door controls were fitted. The motor/trailer car configuration differed from that of the 103–3000 series sets. The single set was withdrawn in March 2005.

Formation
 KuHa 103-3502 (formerly KuHa 103–738)
 MoHa 102-3501 (formerly MoHa 102–2047)
 MoHa 103-3501 (with pantograph) (formerly MoHa 103–790)
 KuHa 103-3501 (formerly KuHa 103–725)

103-3500 series (JR West)

Nine 2-car 103–3500 series refurbished sets (H1 to H9) were formed between September 1997 and March 1998 ahead of Bantan Line electrification in March 1998. Toilets were added between 2005 and 2006.

Formation
 KuMoHa 102-3500 (with toilet)
 KuMoHa 103-3500 (with pantograph)

103-3550 series

Eight 2-car 103–3550 series refurbished sets (M1 to M8) were formed between January and October 2004 ahead of Kakogawa Line electrification in March 2005. These sets feature cab gangway connections and toilets.

Formation
 KuMoHa 102-3550 (with toilet)
 KuMoHa 103-3550 (with pantograph)

Internal training sets
One internal crew training set, formed as KuMoHa 103-100 + MoHa 102–224, was used for internal crew training at the JR East Crew Training Center at Higashi-Omiya Depot. The set had different cab end designs, as MoHa 102-224 used the cab of former ATC equipped KuHa 103–332, sets. It was withdrawn in 2009 following the delivery of a new 209 series-based training set in 2008.

Preserved examples
 KuHa 103-1: Preserved at the Kyoto Railway Museum in Kyoto since April 2016.
 KuHa 103-525: Stored at Toshiba factory in Fuchu, Tokyo
 KuHa 103-713: Preserved at the Railway Museum in Saitama, Saitama (front end only).
 KuMoHa 103-18: Stored at Mino-Ōta Depot in Minokamo, Gifu.
 KuMoHa 103-58: Previously Used at the Toshiba factory in Fuchu, Tokyo. Scrapped in 2011.
 KuMoHa 103-110: Used for training purposes at the Osaka Prefectural Firefighting College in Daito, Osaka.
 KuMoHa 103-147: Privately preserved in Ibaraki Prefecture.

References

Further reading

External links

 
 

Electric multiple units of Japan
Electric multiple units of Indonesia
West Japan Railway Company
East Japan Railway Company
Central Japan Railway Company
Kyushu Railway Company
Train-related introductions in 1964
Hitachi multiple units
Kawasaki multiple units
Nippon Sharyo multiple units
Kinki Sharyo multiple units
Tokyu Car multiple units
1500 V DC multiple units of Japan